Pla y Monge, Ramón Pedro Francisco or the Marquis of Amboage was a philanthropic multimillionaire and politician of the 19th century born in Ferrol, Galicia.

External links
 Panoramic picture of the Marquis of Amboage Square in Ferrol, Galicia

Spanish politicians
People from Galicia (Spain)
Politicians from Galicia (Spain)